Gonolobus is a genus of plant in family Apocynaceae, first described in 1803. It is native to South America, Central America, Mexico, the West Indies, and the southern United States.

Species

 Gonolobus absalonensis -  Martinique
 Gonolobus albiflorus - Jalisco
 Gonolobus albomarginatus - Nicaragua to Ecuador
 Gonolobus ancorifer - Veracruz to Honduras
 Gonolobus antennatus - Colombia, Venezuela
 Gonolobus antioquensis - Colombia
 Gonolobus aristolochiifolius - Guatemala, Chiapas
 Gonolobus aristolochioides - Venezuela
 Gonolobus arizonicus - Arizona
 Gonolobus asper - Oaxaca
 Gonolobus asterias - Costa Rica
 Gonolobus bakeri - Cuba
 Gonolobus barbatus - Veracruz to Honduras
 Gonolobus bifidus - San Luis Potosí
 Gonolobus breedlovei - Chiapas
 Gonolobus brittonii -  Bolivia
 Gonolobus calycosus - Guatemala to Nicaragua
 Gonolobus campii - Ecuador
 Gonolobus caucanus -  Cauca in Colombia
 Gonolobus cearensis - Ceará in Brazil
 Gonolobus chiriquensis - Panama, Costa Rica
 Gonolobus chloranthus - Veracruz
 Gonolobus colombianus - Colombia
 Gonolobus croceus - Sinaloa, Nayarit
 Gonolobus cteniophorus - Veracruz to Honduras
 Gonolobus cuajayote - Chiapas, El Salvador, Nicaragua
 Gonolobus dictyopetalus -  Haiti
 Gonolobus domingensis - Dominican Republic
 Gonolobus donnellsmithianus - Guatemala
 Gonolobus dorothyanus - Rio de Janeiro 
 Gonolobus dussii - Guadeloupe, Martinique
 Gonolobus dutrae - Paraná in Brazil
 Gonolobus edulis - Panama, Costa Rica
 Gonolobus erianthus - Nuevo León + Nayarit to Honduras
 Gonolobus eriocladon - Panama, Colombia
 Gonolobus exannulatus - Chiapas, Guatemala
 Gonolobus farenholtzii -  Venezuela
 Gonolobus fimbriatiflorus - Nicaragua, Panama, Costa Rica, Ecuador
 Gonolobus floribundus -  Bolivia 
 Gonolobus foetidus -  Argentina 
 Gonolobus fraternus - Veracruz to Honduras
 Gonolobus fuscoviolaceus - Panama, Costa Rica
 Gonolobus fuscus - Michoacán
 Gonolobus germanianus -  Venezuela
 Gonolobus glaberrimus - Guatemala
 Gonolobus grandiflorus - Oaxaca
 Gonolobus grayumii - Panama, Costa Rica
 Gonolobus grenadensis - Grenada in West Indies
 Gonolobus grisebachianus - Cuba
 Gonolobus hadrostemma - Costa Rica, Nicaragua
 Gonolobus haitiensis - Haiti
 Gonolobus hammelii - Costa Rica
 †Gonolobus haussknechtii - Mexico?
 Gonolobus heterophyllus - Costa Rica, Nicaragua, Panama
 Gonolobus hildegardiae - Venezuela
 Gonolobus hystrix - Brazil
 Gonolobus inaequalis - Panama, Honduras, Colombia
 Gonolobus incerianus - Veracruz to Nicaragua
 Gonolobus iyanolensis  - St. Lucia Island in West Indies
 Gonolobus jaliscensis - Oaxaca, Jalisco
 Gonolobus lachnostomoides - Columbia
 Gonolobus lanugiflorus -  Guatemala 
 Gonolobus lasiostomus -  Venezuela
 Gonolobus leianthus - Tabasco to Nicaragua
 Gonolobus lewisii - Colombia, Panama
 Gonolobus longipetiolatus -  Guatemala 
 Gonolobus luridus - Querétaro
 Gonolobus luteolus - Tabasco
 †Gonolobus macranthus - Mexico?
 Gonolobus macrotis -  Colombia
 Gonolobus manarae - Venezuela
 Gonolobus marginatus -  Peru 
 Gonolobus marmoreus -  Colombia
 Gonolobus martinicensis -  Martinique
 Gonolobus megalocarpus - Mexico State, Oaxaca
 Gonolobus membranaceus - Haiti 
 Gonolobus micranthus - Fernando de Noronha Islands of Brazil
 Gonolobus mollis - Brazil
 Gonolobus monnicheanus -  Panama
 Gonolobus naturalistae -  Chihuahua, Sinaloa
 Gonolobus nemorosus - Oaxaca
 Gonolobus niger - Veracruz to Guatemala
 Gonolobus ophioglossa - Panama, Costa Rica, Ecuador
 Gonolobus ottonis - Cuba
 Gonolobus pallidus - Chiapas
 Gonolobus parviflorus - Peru
 Gonolobus pectinatus - Puebla
 Gonolobus peruanus - Peru
 Gonolobus pubescens - Jamaica
 Gonolobus purpureus - Peru
 Gonolobus rhamnifolius -  Jamaica 
 Gonolobus riparius - Colombia, Venezuela
 Gonolobus roeanus -  Guatemala
 Gonolobus rostratus - Brazil
 Gonolobus rotundus - Chihuahua
 Gonolobus sagasteguii - Peru
 Gonolobus salvinii - Belize, Guatemala, Honduras, El Salvador
 Gonolobus sandersii - Jalisco, Colima
 Gonolobus saraguranus - Ecuador
 Gonolobus scaber - Venezuela 
 Gonolobus setosus -  Colombia
 Gonolobus sidifolius - Veracruz
 Gonolobus sororius - Jalisco
 Gonolobus spiranthus - Oaxaca
 Gonolobus stapelioides -  Tobago 
 Gonolobus stellatus -  Jamaica 
 Gonolobus stenanthus - Tabasco to Honduras
 Gonolobus stenosepalus - Chiapas, Guatemala, Honduras
 Gonolobus stephanotrichus - Cuba
 Gonolobus steyermarkii - Guatemala
 Gonolobus stipitatus -  Colombia
 Gonolobus stramineus - Chiapas
 Gonolobus striatus - Mexico
 Gonolobus suberosus - SE + SC North America
 Gonolobus taylorianus - Central America
 Gonolobus tenuisepalus -  Costa Rica 
 Gonolobus tetragonus -  Brazil 
 Gonolobus tingens - Hidalgo
 Gonolobus tobagensis -  Tobago 
 Gonolobus triflorus - Oaxaca
 Gonolobus truncatifolius - Costa Rica, Panama
 Gonolobus undulatus -  Colombia
 Gonolobus uniflorus - Oaxaca to Honduras
 Gonolobus ustulatus -  Costa Rica
 Gonolobus variabilis -  Costa Rica
 Gonolobus versicolor - Veracruz to Honduras
 Gonolobus virescens -  Jamaica 
 Gonolobus waitukubuliensis -  Dominica
 Gonolobus xanthotrichus - Veracruz
 Gonolobus youroumaynensis -  St. Vincent in West Indies
 Gonolobus yucatanensis - Quintana Roo, Yucatán State

References

 
Apocynaceae genera
Taxonomy articles created by Polbot